Khafajah or Khafaje (Arabic: خفاجة; ancient Tutub, Arabic: توتوب) is an archaeological site in Diyala Province (Iraq). It was part of the city-state of Eshnunna.

History of archaeological research
Khafajah was excavated for 7 seasons in the early 1930s primarily by an Oriental Institute of Chicago team led by Henri Frankfort with Thorkild Jacobsen and Pinhas Delougaz. For two seasons, the site was worked by a joint team of the American Schools of Oriental Research and the University of Pennsylvania. Among the finds was an Akkadian period die.

Khafajah and its environment
Khafajah lies on the Diyala River, a tributary of the Tigris. The site consists of four mounds, labeled A through D. The main one, Mound A, extends back as far as the Uruk period and contained an oval temple, a temple of the god Sin, and a temple of Nintu. The Dur-Samsuiluna fort was found on mounds B and C. Mound D contained private homes and a temple for the god Sin where the archive tablets where found in two heaps.

The Sin Temple was probably dedicated to the moon god Sin, also known as Nanna in the Sumerian language. This identification is based on the evidence of small crescent moons found within the temple.

The construction of this temple began in 3300-2900 BC (late Uruk or Jemdet-Nasr period), and at least 10 architectural phases have been identified in the subsequent rebuilding that continued. The temple’s last phase was during the Early Dynastic III period.

Occupation history

Early Bronze
Khafajah was occupied during the Early Dynastic Period, through the Sargonid Period, then came under the control of Eshnunna after the fall of the Ur III Empire.

Middle Bronze
Later, after Eshnunna was captured by Babylon, a fort was built at the site by Samsu-iluna of the First Babylonian dynasty and named Dur-Samsuiluna. Mesopotamian chariots were created in Tutub.

Material culture
The history of Khafajah is known in somewhat more detail for a period of several decades as a result of the discovery of 112 clay tablets (one now lost) in a temple of Sin. The tablets constitute part of an official archive and include mostly loan and legal documents. The Oriental Institute of Chicago holds 57 of the tablets with the remainder being in the Iraq Museum. Some Early Dynastic Sumerian statues from Khafajah are on the Oriental Institute's list of Lost Treasures from Iraq (after April 9, 2003); however, they have been housed at the Sulaymaniyah Museum since 1961 (see the gallery below).

Gallery 
The Iraq Museum's Sumerian Gallery displays several Sumerian statues from the Temple of Sin and the Temple of Nintu (V and VI), including part of a hoard found at the Nintu Temple.

See also

Cities of the ancient Near East

References

Further reading
Old Babylonian Public Buildings in the Diyala Region: Part 1 : Excavations at Ishchali, Part 2 : Khafajah Mounds B, C, and D (Publication Series 98), Oriental Institute of the University of Chicago, 1990,

External links

Oriental Institute slides of the site
Archaeology of Khafah write-up at Brown University
Two wrestlers balancing vessels (jars) on their heads- ca. 2600 B.C at Oriental Institute
Bowl with mosaic inlays on outside - ca. 3000 B.C at Oriental Institute
Plaque, decorated with three registers of relief, showing banquet scene with musicians - ca. 2600 B.C at Oriental Institute

1930s archaeological discoveries
Archaeological sites in Iraq
Former populated places in Iraq
Diyala Governorate
Early Dynastic Period (Mesopotamia)
Uruk period